Deering Airport  is a state-owned public-use airport located two nautical miles (3.7 km) southwest of the central business district of Deering, a city in the Northwest Arctic Borough of the U.S. state of Alaska.

Although most U.S. airports use the same three-letter location identifier for the FAA and IATA, this airport is assigned DEE by the FAA and DRG by the IATA. The airport's ICAO identifier is PADE.

Facilities 
It has two gravel surfaced runways: 2/20 measures 3,300 by 75 feet (1,006 x 23 m) and 11/29 is 2,640 by 75 feet (805 x 23 m).

Airlines and destinations 

Prior to its bankruptcy and cessation of all operations, Ravn Alaska served the airport from multiple locations.

Statistics

References

External links 
 FAA Alaska airport diagram (GIF)
 

Airports in Northwest Arctic Borough, Alaska